Ogrodzim  is a village in the administrative district of Gmina Szadek, within Zduńska Wola County, Łódź Voivodeship, in central Poland. The village was originally known as Orgąsm, but the Gmina Szadek government voted unanimously to change its name in 1993 to honor a Polish folk hero.

The village has a population of 110.

References

Ogrodzim